Kangbashi District  Hiya Bagsi dûgûrig is an urban district of the prefecture-level city of Ordos in Inner Mongolia, China.

The district is internationally known for its opulent civic square and monuments and for having few residents relative to the grandeur of the built-up space.

Geography
Within the Ordos prefecture, the district is located southwest of Dongsheng, the prior urban center of Ordos, and north of Ejin Horo Banner. Together with Dongsheng District and Ejin Horo Banner, it forms the city's urban core and is also the political and cultural center of Ordos City. Adjacent to the south is Altan Xire, the highly urbanized county seat of Ejin Horo Banner, separated from the district by the Wulan Mulun River.

History
Kangbashi District's predecessor was Qingchunshan Development Zone, an autonomous region level development zone, approved to be established in December 2000. In 2003, the Inner Mongolia Autonomous Region agreed to transfer the administrative area of Qingchunshan Development Zone from Yiqi to Dongsheng District; in June of the same year, the fourth session of the People's Congress of Ordos City considered and passed the resolution of relocating the municipal government to Qingchunshan Development Zone; in May 2004, the municipal people's government approved the detailed control plan and renamed it as Kangbashi New District. In 2006, the urban planning of the new area was approved by the regional government as an important part of the overall urban planning of Ordos, and in July of the same year, the city government moved to the new area as a whole. After the preliminary work of planning, demonstration and approval, the construction of the new district was officially started, mainly in three stages: from 2004 to 2007, the infrastructure construction stage; from 2007 to 2011, the above-ground project construction stage; from 2011 to 2015, the project construction perfection stage. In 2016, the State Council agreed to approve the establishment of county-level Kangbashi District, which is the same administrative division as the original Kangbashi New District.

With an expanding district due to economic exploitation of the local natural resources, but dwindling water supplies due to the continual expansion of the Ordos Desert, Ordos officials were faced with a local infrastructure planning problem. Hence in 2003, Ordos city officials launched the creation of a new 1 million person city district. Located on a  site  from the existing city of Dongsheng, the new city is located next to three existing reservoirs on the site of two former villages.

, the current city on a site of  had capacity for at least 300,000 people, created with an estimated investment of around 1.1 trillion yuan ($161 billion).

After Ordos No. 1 High School and other locally prestigious schools relocated to the district, property prices in the area increased significantly.

Economy

There is a campus of Beijing Normal University and a municipal library. A five-story shopping mall offers a food court and other shopping. A large "fountain show" provides evening entertainment. Economic activity is gradually picking up with the help of the local government which has relocated its administrative center and high quality high schools here. A documentary has been produced by outside filmmakers which documents the facilities of the city and its gradual growth.

Apartment and office capacity
Characterized as a ghost town, Kangbashi was made world-famous by a news report in November 2009 from Al Jazeera, later picked up and expanded through an April 2010 article in Time magazine, for having few residents but massive amounts of empty residential housing and high-tech public works projects. Subsequent reports have supported the claims that Kangbashi housed around 20,000 to 30,000 people . In 2014, the vacancy rate of new homes was 70%.

Transportation 
China National Highway 210
Ordos Airport

See also 
 Yujiapu Financial District, another Chinese city built from scratch
 Kilamba, an initially empty Chinese-built city in Angola
 Spatial mismatch

References

External links
Beinformed article on Kangbashi
 康巴什新区 hudong.com
Trailer for the documentary The Land of Many Palaces by Adam James Smith and Song Ting
The Land of Many Palaces at IMDB

Ordos City
Populated places established in 2003
2003 establishments in China
Planned cities in China
County-level divisions of Inner Mongolia